Ifereimi Vasu (born ~1960) is a Fijian politician and Cabinet Minister. He is a member of the Social Democratic Liberal Party (SODELPA).

Vasu previously served in the Republic of Fiji Military Forces, reaching the rank of lieutenant colonel. He did not participate in the 1987, 2000, or 2006 coups, being in training or overseas at the time. Following the 2006 Fijian coup d'état he was appointed as commissioner for the Eastern District by the Bainamarama regime. In 2011 he was appointed Corrections Service Commissioner. As corrections commissioner he oversaw the imprisonment of former prime minister Laisenia Qarase.

In December 2015 he was fired as corrections commissioner and charged with abuse of office following an investigation by the Fiji Independent Commission Against Corruption. He was acquitted by the High Court of Fiji in December 2019.

In June 2022 he was selected as a SODELPA candidate for the 2022 Fijian general election. He was elected to the Parliament of Fiji with 1427 votes. On 24 December 2022 he was appointed Minister for iTaukei Affairs, Culture, Heritage and Arts in the coalition government of Sitiveni Rabuka.

References

Living people
Fijian soldiers
Social Democratic Liberal Party politicians
Members of the Parliament of Fiji
Government ministers of Fiji
Culture ministers of Fiji
Year of birth missing (living people)